Bachelite is the second album released by the Italian indie/electronica band Offlaga Disco Pax. Recorded between May and October 2007 and mastered in October in New York City, the album was published by Santeria Records on February 8, 2008. With this album the band developed its sound, which became much more electronica-influenced than in Socialismo tascabile (Prove tecniche di trasmissione).

Track listing
songs written by Collini and Fontanelli, except where indicated.
 "Superchiome" – 4:22
 "Ventrale" – 3:18
 "Dove ho messo la Golf?" – 6:18
 "Sensibile" (Fontanelli, Carretti, Collini) – 5:49
 "Lungimiranza" (4:00
 "Cioccolato I.A.C.P." (Collini, Carretti) – 9:19
 "Fermo!" (Collini, Carretti) – 5:43)
 "Onomastica" (Collini, Carretti) – 5:55
 "Venti minuti" – 7:03

Thematic elements
Bachelite's themes are similar to the ones in Offlaga Disco Pax's debut album, Socialismo tascabile (Prove tecniche di trasmissione). Collini writes once again about people, athletes and daily happenings linking them to politics, even though Bachelite is more introverted and cryptic than its predecessor.

"Superchiome"
Punk music
Korn
The village of Albinea
Dave Grohl
"Ventrale"
Vladimir Yashchenko
The 1978 European Championships in Athletics
Jacek Wszoła
Lech Wałęsa
Dietmar Mögenburg
Javier Sotomayor
La Gazzetta dello Sport, an Italian newspaper.
Doctor Who
"Dove ho messo la Golf?"
Volkswagen Golf
Litfiba, an Italian rock band
Luiz Inácio Lula da Silva
"Sensibile"
Francesca Mambro and Valerio Fioravanti, culprits for the 1980 Bologna massacre
Fiat Uno, referring the case of "the band of the white Uno", la banda della Uno bianca
Nuclei Armati Rivoluzionari, an Italian neofascist terrorist organization.
"Lungimiranza"
The "Associazione Ricreativa e Culturale Italiana" (ARCI), an Italian cultural association.
Luciano Ligabue
Vinicio Capossela
"Cioccolato I.A.C.P."
The "Istituto Autonomo Case Popolari" (IACP), the Italian public housing organization.
Vladivostok
Toblerone chocolate
"Fermo!"
The Chirocephalus marchesonii
Monte Vettore
The Parco Nazionale dei Monti Sibillini
"Onomastica"
Jean Jaurès
"Venti Minuti"
Military Service in Italy

Personnel 
 Enrico Fontanelli - bass, keyboards
 Daniele Carretti - guitar, bass
 Max Collini - vocals

Other musicians
 Francesco Donadello – drums in Ventrale
 Deborah Naomi Walker - cello in Sensibile
 Jukka Reverberi - vocals in Cioccolato I.A.C.P. and Fermo!
 Nicola Manzan - vocals in Cioccolato I.A.C.P.
 Andrea Fumagalli - saxophone in Onomastica

External links
 Bachelite's page on the label's website
 Offlaga Disco Pax's blog

2008 albums
Offlaga Disco Pax albums